Marko Virtala (born April 15, 1985) is a Finnish ice hockey player. He is currently playing with HC TPS in the Finnish Liiga.

Virtala made his SM-liiga debut playing with Lukko during the 2007–08 season.

References

External links

1985 births
Living people
Finnish ice hockey forwards
Lukko players
HC TPS players
People from Uusikaupunki
Sportspeople from Southwest Finland